The Men's light-featherweight -57 kg paraplegic was an event in weightlifting at the 1980 Summer Paralympics, for paraplegic athletes. Sweden's Benny Nilsson recorded a lift of 175 kg to win gold.

Results

See also
 Weightlifting at the 1980 Summer Paralympics

References 

1980 Summer Paralympics events
1980
Paralympics